Spring greens are a cultivar of Brassica oleracea in the cultivar acephala group, similar to kale, in which the central leaves do not form a head or form only a very loose one. It is considered to be closer to wild cabbage than most other domesticated forms, and is grown primarily in northern Europe, where its tolerance of cold winters is valued for an early spring supply of edible leaves. The cultivar group acephala also includes curly kale and collard greens, which are extremely similar genetically.

The term is also used more loosely to refer to thinnings and trimmed-off leaves of other types of Brassica, including turnip and swede leaves, surplus thinned out young cabbage plants and leaves from cauliflower and Brussels sprouts. 

In all cases, the leaves, being loose, are fully exposed to light and atmospheric conditions, so are darker green, coarser, often tougher, and more strongly flavoured than cabbages that form a closed head, but are also particularly rich in vitamin C, folate and dietary fibre, making them a very healthy food.

Brassica
Leaf vegetables